Gobiodon acicularis, the needlespine coral goby, is a species of goby native to the western central Pacific Ocean where it is an inhabitant of tropical coral reefs and eelgrass beds from Indonesia to Palau. It grows to a length of  SL.

References

acicularis
Fish described in 1995
Fish of the Pacific Ocean